Shahrak-e Elahiyeh (also Romanized as Shahrak-e Elāhīyeh; also known as Elāhīyeh) is a village in Chahardangeh Rural District, Chaharbagh District, Savojbolagh County, Alborz Province, Iran. At the 2006 census, its population was 57, in 15 families.

References 

Populated places in Savojbolagh County